Janice Wainwright (born 2 December 1940) is a British fashion designer. She is known for creating glamorous bias-cut and tailored pieces using high quality fabrics featuring intricate embroidery and applique. The Fashion Museum, Bath holds several pieces her work, and the Victoria and Albert Museum also holds three of her pieces in its permanent collection.

Biography 
Wainwright was born in Chesterfield, Derbyshire and grew up in Wimbledon, London. She studied at the Wimbledon School of Art and Kingston School of Art before gaining a place at the Royal College of Art in London. She studied under Janey Ironside and was part of a new wave of British fashion talent emerging from the College in the 1960s. Her contemporaries included Moya Bowler, Bill Gibb, Marion Foale and Sally Tuffin.

After graduation,  she designed for Simon Massey from the late 1960s. After a period of freelancing she set up her own label “Janice Wainwright at Forty Seven Poland Street” in 1970. When she moved premises in 1974 the label ran as “Janice Wainwright” until its closure in 1990.

She was one of two designers permitted to use Celia Birtwell's printed textiles in the 1960s.

In 2019 Kate Moss attended Marc Jacob's wedding wearing vintage Janice Wainwright.

References 

Alumni of Wimbledon College of Arts
British fashion designers

1940 births
Living people